Zachełmie may refer to the following places in Poland:
Zachełmie, Lower Silesian Voivodeship (south-west Poland)
Zachełmie, Świętokrzyskie Voivodeship (south-central Poland)
Zachełmie, West Pomeranian Voivodeship (north-west Poland)